The Ethiopia International is an international badminton tournament established in 2011, held in Addis Ababa, Ethiopia, and rated as BWF Future Series event. The 2011 tournament points used as a qualification for the players to compete at the London Olympic Games. In 2014, the tournament level-up to International Series, with total prize money US$ 5.000 The tournament is aimed at evaluating and improving the stage and performance of players; and also to show the image of Ethiopia.

Previous winners

References

External links 
BWF Calendar 
Africa Badminton

Badminton tournaments in Ethiopia
Sports competitions in Ethiopia
Recurring sporting events established in 2011